Unilez Takyi (born 20 August 2004) is a Ghanaian swimmer. She competed in the women's 50 metre freestyle at the 2020 Summer Olympics.

References

External links
 

2004 births
Living people
Ghanaian female swimmers
Olympic swimmers of Ghana
Swimmers at the 2020 Summer Olympics
Sportspeople from Mantua
Italian sportspeople of African descent
Italian people of Ghanaian descent
21st-century Ghanaian women
Swimmers at the 2022 Commonwealth Games
Commonwealth Games competitors for Ghana